Cathy Coudyser (born 14 December 1969) is a Belgian politician and a member of the New Flemish Alliance.

Biography
Coudyser is a native of Knokke-Heist in West Flanders. She worked as an investment advisor for KBC Bank before establishing a jewelry business with her husband. In 2003, she established a local branch for the N-VA in Knokke-Heist and was a municipal councilor for the party there until 2011. In 2014, she was appointed to the Member of the Chamber of Representatives following the resignation of Manu Beuselinck. She held this role until 2014 when she was elected to the Flemish Parliament. In the Flemish Parliament, she focuses on matters related to tourism.

References

Living people
1969 births
Members of the Flemish Parliament
New Flemish Alliance politicians
21st-century Belgian women politicians
21st-century Belgian politicians